Aedes is a genus of mosquitoes originally found in tropical and subtropical zones, but now found on all continents except perhaps Antarctica. Some species have been spread by human activity: Aedes albopictus, a particularly invasive species, was spread to the New World, including the United States, in the 1980s, by the used-tire trade.

First described and named by German entomologist Johann Wilhelm Meigen in 1818, the generic name comes from the Ancient Greek ἀηδής, aēdēs, meaning "unpleasant" or "odious". The type species for Aedes is Aedes cinereus.

Systematics and phylogeny

The genus was named by Johann Wilhelm Meigen in 1818. The generic name comes from the Ancient Greek ἀηδής, aēdēs, meaning "unpleasant"  or "odious".

As historically defined, the genus contains over 700 species (see the list of Aedes species). The genus has been divided into several subgenera (Aedes, Diceromyia, Finlaya, Stegomyia, etc.), most of which have been recently treated by some authorities as full genera. The classification was revised in 2009.

Characteristics
Aedes mosquitoes are visually distinctive because they have noticeable black and white markings on their bodies and legs. Unlike most other mosquitoes, they are active and bite only during the daytime. The peak biting periods are early in the morning and in the evening before dusk.

Direct children of this genus 
The genus contains 28 species that are not placed in a further subgenus:
Aedes daliensis 
Aedes mallochi 
Aedes alticola 
Aedes auronitens 
Aedes australiensis 
Aedes biocellatus 
Aedes britteni 
Aedes candidoscutellum 
Aedes crossi 
Aedes eatoni 
Aedes gracilelineatus 
Aedes keefei 
Aedes peipingensis 
Aedes koreicoides 
Aedes lauriei 
Aedes monocellatus 
Aedes oreophilus 
Aedes plagosus 
Aedes quasirubithorax 
Aedes roai 
Aedes rubiginosus 
Aedes sintoni  
Aedes stanleyi 
Aedes subauridorsum 
Aedes toxopeusi 
Aedes tsiliensis 
Aedes versicolor  
Aedes wasselli

As disease vectors
Members of the genus Aedes are known vectors for numerous viral infections, including dengue fever, yellow fever, the Zika virus, and chikungunya, which are transmitted by species in the subgenus Stegomyia, and by A. aegypti and A. albopictus. Infections with these viruses are typically accompanied by a fever, and in some cases, encephalitis, which can lead to death. A vaccine to provide protection from yellow fever exists, and measures to prevent mosquito bites include insecticides such as DDT, mosquito traps, insect repellents, mosquito nets, and pest control using genetically modified insects. In Polynesia, the species Aedes polynesiensis is responsible for the transmission of human lymphatic filariasis. 

Aedes can be detected and monitored by ovitraps.

Sequencing
The genome of the yellow fever mosquito (Aedes aegypti) was sequenced by the Broad Institute and the Institute for Genomic Research. The initial assembly was released in August 2005; a draft sequence of the genome and preliminary analysis was published in June 2007. The annotated genome is available at VectorBase. An updated and improved version of the Aedes aegypti genome was released in 2018.

References

External links 
 Singapore Government dengue site that describes the mosquito
 

 
Mosquito genera
Taxa named by Johann Wilhelm Meigen